is a Japanese surname. It literally means "hot spring valley".

Places 
 There are several hot springs named Yutani Onsen

Other 
 Yutani Corporation, a Japanese pneumatic tool manufacturer established in 1918.
 Weyland-Yutani, a fictional megacorporation in the Alien films
 Yutani Corporation (Aliens), a predecessor military arms corporation to Weyland-Yutani, see Aliens vs. Predator: Requiem
 Ms. Yutani, a character in Aliens vs. Predator: Requiem, see List of Alien vs. Predator characters
 Yutani, an unlockable character in the mobile game Subway Surfers

See also
 Japanese name

Japanese-language surnames